= Scarlet Mubokyi =

Scarlet Mubokyi is a Ugandan physician and occupational health specialist.

== Early life and education ==
Mubokyi holds a Diploma in Occupational Medicine scholarship.

The Uganda Medical and Dental Practitioners Council's online register lists her as a specialist medical practitioner, with registration recorded on 4 November 2012. Her career has focused on occupational medicine and workplace health and safety. In 2025, she received a scholarship to pursue a Professional Diploma in Occupational Medicine through iheed and the International Occupational Medicine Society Collaborative (IOMSC).

== Career ==
Mubokyi has served in the Ministry of Gender, Labour and Social Development, within the Department of Occupational Safety and Health (DOSH), where she has been associated with occupational health inspection and the promotion of safe working environments Senior and In January 2007, she was appointed a Senior Occupational Physician and inspector under the Occupational Safety and Health Act, 2006

Mubokyi received international recognition in August 2025 when she was selected as one of three recipients of the 2025 Occupational Medicine Scholarship awarded by the International Occupational Medicine Society Collaborative (IOMSC) in partnership with iheed and this gave her an opportunity to pursue the Royal College of Physicians of Ireland (RCPI) Online Professional Diploma in Occupational Medicine

She was the speaker in the programme for the East African Mental Health Summit 2026, under a session addressing policy reforms to advance mental health and well-being in the workplace.
